(−)-β-Chamigrene is the parent compound of subclass of sesquiterpenes found in various marine and terrestrial plants.  The stereoisomer (−)-β-chamigrene is the most common in nature.

Chamigrenes (chamigrene-related compounds) are characterized by a spiro[5.5]undecane core with an all-carbon quaternary stereocenter at the junction of the spirocycle.

References

Sesquiterpenes
Spiro compounds